James G. Woodward (January 14, 1845August 29, 1923) was an American newspaperman and politician, having served as the 36th, 39th and 43rd Mayor of Atlanta, Georgia.

Woodward made his living as printer through the newsrooms of the Atlanta Journal and Constitution over the years.
He was elected Mayor in 1899 and 1904.
Following the Atlanta race riot of 1906, he won the 1908 Democratic primary (in a virtually one party state) but was arrested for public intoxication less than a month before the December general election and was defeated by Robert Maddox.
He served his third and fourth terms following Courtland Winn.
Trying for a fifth term as Atlanta mayor, he ran (and lost) in September 1922, a year before his death.

The Atlanta race riot of 1906 was a defining moment of Woodward's political career, to which occasion he did not rise.

The New York Times reported that when Woodward was asked as to the measures taken to prevent a race riot, he replied:
The best way to prevent a race riot depends entirely upon the cause. If your inquiry has anything to do with the present situation in Atlanta then I would say the only remedy is to remove the cause. As long as the black brutes assault our white women, just so long will they be unceremoniously dealt with.He had gone around the city on Saturday night trying to calm the mobs, but was generally ignored.

Notes

1845 births
1923 deaths
Mayors of Atlanta